Cat Tail Brook is a tributary of Rock Brook in central New Jersey in the United States.

Course

See also
List of rivers of New Jersey

References

External links
USGS Coordinates in Google Maps

Tributaries of the Raritan River
Rivers of New Jersey
Rivers of Somerset County, New Jersey